Bill Windauer (born November 22, 1949) is a former American football defensive tackle. He played for the Baltimore Colts from 1973 to 1974, the New York Giants in 1975 and for the Atlanta Falcons in 1976.

References

1949 births
Living people
Players of American football from Chicago
American football defensive tackles
Iowa Hawkeyes football players
Baltimore Colts players
New York Giants players
Atlanta Falcons players